The National Adult Baseball Association (NABA) is an adult, amateur baseball organization, headquartered in Denver, Colorado. It offers competitive and recreational baseball for players in over 125 leagues in over 40 U.S. states. Over 25,000 player-members participate.

The NABA is organized into groups categorized by age. The largest division of play is the Open Division (18 & Over), but there are also divisions for 25 Wood, 25 Aluminum, 35 Wood, 35 Aluminum, 45 Wood, 45 Aluminum, 50 Wood, 55 Wood, and 60 Wood.

Where participation levels permit, leagues are divided into two or more competitive divisions. These divisions are then classified by experience level. The advanced level (AAA) is typically for players who have 3–4 years of college baseball and/or professional baseball experience. The intermediate level (AA) is generally for the players with high school baseball or some college experience. Finally, the recreational level (A) provides an opportunity for players whose love of the game perhaps exceeds their level of experience.

World championship series
Phoenix World Championship Series
Division championships: 18 Wood, 18AA, 18A, 18 Rookie, 25 Wood, 25 Aluminum, 35 Wood, 35 Aluminum, 45 Wood, 45 Aluminum, 50 Wood, 55 Wood, 60 Wood.
Awards:
Team Champions: team trophy and NABA World Series championship rings
Team Runner-up: team trophy and NABA World Series championship watches
Team Pool Champion: team pool trophy
Championship Game Gold Glove: individual Gold Glove award for each championship game
Championship Game MVP: individual MVP award for each championship game
Pool Game MVP: individual Game MVP award in each pool game for both teams
NABA Women's World Championship Series
Awards:
Champions: team trophy and NABA World Series commemorative championship medal
Runner-up: team trophy and NABA World Series commemorative finalist medal
Pool Winner: team pool trophy
Championship Game Gold Glove: individual Gold Glove award for each championship game
Championship Game MVP: individual MVP award for each championship game
Pool Game MVP: individual Game MVP award in each pool game for both teams
Florida World Championship Series
Division championships: 18AA, 18A, 18 Rookie, 18 Open Wood Bat, 25 Rookie, 35 Rookie, 45 Rookie, 55 Rookie
Awards:
Champions: team trophy and NABA World Series championship rings
Runner-up: team trophy and NABA World Series championship watches
Pool Winner: team pool trophy
Championship Game Gold Glove: individual Gold Glove award for each championship game
Championship Game MVP: individual MVP award for each championship game
Pool Game MVP: individual Game MVP award in each pool game for both teams

Tournaments
(in chronological order)
California Kickoff Classic "Wood-Bat"
Citrus Classic
Las Vegas Kickoff Classic
Boricua Caribbean Classic
Las Vegas Memorial Day Tournament
Atlantic City Memorial Day Tournament
Hall of Fame Tournament (Cooperstown)
Mile High Classic "Wood-Bat" Tournament
Atlantic City Labor Day Games Tournament
Slammers Baseball / NABA 18 & Under and 16 & Under High School Showcase Tournament (wood bat)
Division championships:
18 & Under (seniors and juniors) – Goodyear, Arizona
16 & Under (sophomores and freshmen) – Glendale, Arizona
Awards:
Champions: team trophy and individual awards
Runner-up: team trophy
Championship Game Gold Glove: individual Gold Glove award for each championship game
Championship Game MVP: individual MVP award for each championship game
NABA Over-50 & Over-60 Baseball National "Fun" Tournament
Division championships: Over-50 Wood Division, Over-50 Aluminum Division, Over-60 Wood Division
Awards:
Champions: team trophy and NABA commemorative individual awards
Runner-up: team trophy and NABA commemorative individual awards
Pool Winner: team pool champion award

Hall of fame
For a list of inductees, see footnote

The NABA Hall of Fame was established in 1999.

See also
Amateur baseball in the United States
Baseball awards#U.S. adult & semi-professional baseball

References

External links
NABA official website

Baseball governing bodies in the United States
Baseball in Colorado
Organizations based in Denver